Agawmeder (Amharic: አገው ምድር) was a historical state and region in the northwestern part of Ethiopia. Its most likely etymology is from Agew (አገው ägäw), a people living in the area, plus meder (land), thus meaning "Land of the Agaw". The western neighbor of Gojjam, it was located where the Agew Awi Zone now lies.

History
Not much is known about Agawmeder, as much of its existence was marked by Ethiopian isolation from the remainder of the world.

References

Geography of Ethiopia
Regions of Ethiopia